The Peruvian Inquisition was established on January 9, 1570 and ended in 1820. The Holy Office and tribunal of the Inquisition were located in Lima, the administrative center of the Viceroyalty of Peru.

History
Unlike the Spanish Inquisition and the Medieval Inquisition, in the Peruvian Inquisition both the authorities and the church were dependent of the Crown's approval to carry out jurisdiction.

Holy Office documents show that various tests were created to identify Jews, Lutherans and Muslims, with members of those groups punished, tortured or killed for their beliefs. 

In 1813 it was first abolished by virtue of a Cortes decree. In 1815 it was reconstituted but their target was now the ideas from the French Encyclopédistes and similar texts, and most people who were accused of crimes were only given probation. With the promotion of Freemason José de la Serna to the viceroyship, which coincided with the rise of the nationalist faction (as both factions prepared to fight each other in the Peruvian War of Independence), the Inquisition fell apart of its own volition.

Statistics 
A review of the figures given by Escandell indicates that in its beginnings the Court was dedicated to supervising the European population. It includes both the so-called "old Christians" and some descendants of converts, mainly those of Jewish descent, who, evading express royal prohibitions, arrived in the Hispano-American provinces. It must be reiterated that the great majority of the Peruvian population was made up of indigenous people, who, as neophytes in Christianity, remained outside the sphere of jurisdiction of the Court, in accordance with the provisions of the kings of Spain. Also striking is the high percentage of foreign defendants, which exceeds their corresponding demographic participation. This has been calculated for the period 1532-1560 between 8% and 12%. This is explained by reasons of State that made it essential to control possible spies of the enemy powers of Spain.

Regarding the type of sentences, most of them are abjurations that total 173 and are equivalent to 67%. Thus, two thirds of those sentenced abjured their errors, to which were added, mostly, some spiritual penalties and the payment of the costs of the processes or some fines. The reconciled and the acquitted reached 30 and 29 respectively, while the suspended processes were 8. 6 were sentenced to death and 9 effigies were burned. Of those sentenced to burning, 5 were Portuguese Judaizers: Lucena de Baltasar, Duarte Núñez de Cea -both left in the car of 1600- Duarte Enríquez, Diego López de Vargas and Gregorio Díaz Tavares left in the car of 1605. The bachelor Juan Bautista del Castillo was the only person from Lima sentenced to death at the stake -in the entire history of this Court- for propositions contrary to faith, which he spread throughout the city in the midst of public scandal.

Sentenced to death by the Court of Lima (1569-1820)

See also
Mexican Inquisition
Palace of Inquisition
Manuel Bautista Pérez

Footnotes

Further reading

Böhm, Günter. "Crypto-Jews and New Christians in Colonial Peru and Chile." In The Jews and the Expansion of Europe to the West, 1450-1800, edited by Paolo Bernardini and Norman Fiering, 203–212. New York: Berghahn Books, 2001.
Cross, Harry E. "Commerce and Orthodoxy: A Spanish Response to Portuguese Commercial Penetration in the Viceroyalty of Peru, 1580-1640." The Americas 35 (1978): 151–167.
 Hampe-Martinez, Teodoro. "Recent Work on the Inquisition and Peruvian Colonial Society,1570-1820". Latin American Research Review. Vol. 31 No.2 (1996).
 Lea, Henry Charles. The Inquisition in Spanish Dependencies; Sicily, Naples, Sardina, Milan, the Canaries, Mexico, Peru, New Granada. New York: The Macmillan Company, 1908.
Lewin, Boleslao. El Santo Oficio en América: y el más grande proceso inquisitorial en el Perú. Buenos Aires: Sociedad Hebraica Argentina, 1950.
Liebman, Seymour. "The Great Conspiracy in Peru," The Americas 28 (1971): 176–190.
Medina, José Toribio. Historia del Tribunal del Santo Oficio de la Inquisición de Lima (1569-1820). 2 vols. Santiago: Imprenta Gutenberg, 1887.
 Roth, Roth. The Spanish Inquisition. New York: W.W. Norton & Company, 1964.
Schaposchnik, Ana E. The Lima Inquisition: The Plight of the Crypto-Jews in Seventeenth-Century Peru. Madison: University of Wisconsin Press, 2015.
Silverblatt, Irene. Modern Inquisitions: Peru and the Colonial Origins of the Civilized World. Durham, NC: Duke University Press, 2004.
Ventura, Maria da Graça A. Mateus. "Los judeoconversos portugueses en el Perú del siglo XVII: Redes de complicidad." In Familia, Religión y Negocio: El sefardismo en las relaciones entre el mundo ibérico y los Países Bajos en la Edad Moderna, edited by Jaime Contreras, Bernardo J. García García, e Ignacio Pulido, 391–406. Madrid: Fundación Carlos Amberes, 2002.

External links
Henry C. Lea (1829-1909): The Inquisition in 17th-Century Peru: Cases of Portuguese Judaizers from the Internet Modern Sourcebook
"South and Central America: Peru and Chile", from the Jewish Encyclopedia (1901).
Museo de la Inqusición y del Congreso, located in Lima, Peru.
Catholic Church in Peru
History of Peru
Inquisition